Susanne Rappmann (née Norrhall; born 2 February 1965 in Norra Vram, Skåne), is a Swedish theologian and current Bishop of Gothenburg.

Biography
Susanne Rappmann was ordained priest for the Diocese of Gothenburg in 1992 and has served as a parish priest of Annedal Church from 1994 till 1999. She later became parish priest of Stensjöns and served between 2007 and 2010. Afterwards she was appointed as the church minister of the parish of Värö-Stråvalla and served between 2010 and 2013. Between 2013 and 2018 she was a curator in Mölndal parish, which was formed in 2014.

In 2005 Rappmann presented her dissertation titled Kristi kropp som kritisk metafor : teologisk reflektion kring funktionshinder (Christ's body as critical metaphor: theological reflection on disability) at Karlstad University.

Bishop
In November 2017 Rappmann was elected bishop during the second and final election gaining around 70% of the votes. Rappmann was consecrated bishop by the Archbishop of Uppsala on March 4, 2018. She became the first female bishop of Gothenburg, replacing Per Eckerdal.

References

1965 births
Living people
Swedish Lutheran bishops
21st-century Lutheran bishops
Bishops of Gothenburg
Karlstad University alumni
Swedish women curators